Ted Burgess (born 11 February 1945) is  a former Australian rules footballer who played with Footscray in the Victorian Football League (VFL).

Notes

External links 		
		
		
		
		
		
		
Living people		
1945 births		
		
Australian rules footballers from Victoria (Australia)		
Western Bulldogs players
Lalor Football Club players